Music Hall of Williamsburg (formerly Northsix) is a New York City venue located at 66 North 6th Street in the Williamsburg neighborhood of Brooklyn. The venue is operated by The Bowery Presents, a group stemming from Bowery Ballroom. It has a capacity of 650 people and has shows on most nights of the week.

History
The venue opened in the spring of 2001 as Northsix, and was one of the first of a wave of music venues to open in Brooklyn. Prior to the opening of Northsix, Manhattan was the primary borough in New York City where indie rock, underground, cutting-edge or avant-garde rock concerts were held. Northsix maintained an eclectic booking schedule and hosted countless notable music/comedy performances.

Northsix was named Best New Rock Club in 2002 by The Village Voice, as well as Best Rock Club and Best Williamsburg Music Venue in 2002 by a New York Press reader's poll. In 2003, Northsix was the location that was filmed for the opening scene of the 2003 Richard Linklater film School of Rock.

Northsix hosted a three-night run of critically acclaimed Elliott Smith shows in June 2003, which would turn out to be his last New York performances before his death later that year

Northsix was shut down by the New York City Fire Department on March 15, 2003, over a controversial booking of the band Leftöver Crack. The fire department cited an expired permit as the reason for the vacate order, but it is widely believed among those in the New York music scene that the action was in retaliation for booking a band that had openly criticized the department. The venue was able to reopen after a month of negotiation with city officials.

Due to gentrification and a major rent increase, the venue was acquired by the New York-based concert promotion company Bowery Presents in the beginning of 2007. The venue was remodeled, renovated and renamed Music Hall of Williamsburg.

See also

 List of music venues

References

External links
 Music Hall of Williamsburg

2001 establishments in New York City
2007 disestablishments in New York (state)
Entertainment venues in Brooklyn
Former music venues in New York City
Williamsburg, Brooklyn
Music venues in Brooklyn